James Bater (born 7 January 1980) is a Welsh former rugby union footballer who played as a flanker at club level for Swansea RFC, and in the Celtic League for the Ospreys and the Scarlets.

Born in Bridgend, Bater began his professional rugby career at Swansea RFC, before moving to the Ospreys at the team's inception at the dawn of regional rugby in Wales. In his three years at the Ospreys, Bater made a total of 67 appearances, scoring six tries. However, due to the rise of future Wales captain Ryan Jones and the signings of Filo Tiatia and Jono Gibbes, Bater found himself on the fringes of the first team at the Ospreys. The Scarlets came in with a bid for him, and he was allowed to leave. Bater has managed to make a place for himself in the Scarlets side, and has even captained the team when regular captain, Simon Easterby, and vice-captain, Stephen Jones, are on international duty.

In March 2009 it was announced that Bater had been forced to retire due to a neck injury and hoped to return to dentistry. Bater resumed his career in dentistry and now works for a dental practice in Skewen, Wales.

He attained his only international cap as a replacement against Romania on 27 August 2003.

References

External links
Scarlets profile

1980 births
Living people
Rugby union players from Bridgend
Welsh rugby union players
Rugby union flankers
Ospreys (rugby union) players
Scarlets players
Swansea RFC players
Wales international rugby union players
People educated at Ysgol Brynteg